89 Herculis is a binary star system located about 4,700 light years away from the Sun in the northern constellation of Hercules. It is visible to the naked eye as a faint, fifth magnitude star. The system is moving closer to the Earth with a heliocentric radial velocity of −28.5 km/s.

This is a spectroscopic binary with the pair surrounded by a dusty disc. The system shows variable brightness and spectral line profiles. The companion has a very low mass and luminosity and orbits the primary in 288 days.

The primary component has a stellar classification of F2Ibe, and is among a rare class of post-asymptotic giant branch stars – low-mass stars in the last stages of their lives, highly inflated to appear as supergiants. It is classified as a semiregular variable star, subtype SRd, and ranges from magnitude 5.3 down to 5.5 over a period of around 68 days. The star has expanded to 71 times the Sun's radius and is radiating 8,350 times the Sun's luminosity from its enlarged photosphere at an effective temperature of 6,550 K.

References

External links

Hercules (constellation)
F-type supergiants
Herculis, 089
6685
163506
BD+26 3120
087747
Spectroscopic binaries
Herculis, V441
Post-asymptotic-giant-branch stars
Emission-line stars